Davide Giordano (22 March 1864 Courmayeur – 1 February 1954 Venezia) was an Italian physician and politician.

He came from a Waldensian family originally from Torre Pellice, the son of Giacomo and Susetta Hugon.

He was president of Ateneo Veneto, Venice's Institute of Science, Literature and Arts.

20th-century Italian physicians
20th-century Italian politicians
1864 births
1954 deaths
People from Courmayeur